K. Murugesan Anandan is a member of the 15th Lok Sabha of India. He represented the Viluppuram constituency of Tamil Nadu and is a member of the All India Anna Dravida Munnetra Kazhagam political party.

Viluppuram constituency is reserved under Scheduled Caste category.

Background
K. Murugesan Anandan is an undergraduate. An agriculturist by profession, he has held various offices since 1985.

Posts held
He was elected to the Tamil Nadu legislative assembly as an Anna Dravida Munnetra Kazhagam candidate from Ulundurpet constituency in 1984, and 1991 elections.

See also
List of members of the 15th Lok Sabha of India

References 

1951 births
Living people
India MPs 2009–2014
Lok Sabha members from Tamil Nadu
People from Viluppuram district
All India Anna Dravida Munnetra Kazhagam politicians
Tamil Nadu MLAs 1985–1989
Tamil Nadu MLAs 1991–1996
Tamil Nadu politicians